Max Leonard Rosenheim, Baron Rosenheim, KBE, PRCP, FRS (15 March 1908 – 2 December 1972) was a British physician and academic.

Education
Max Leonard Rosenheim was born in London to Ludwig Rosenheim, a stockbroker, whose father was from Würzburg, Germany, and Martha Reichenbach, whose father was from St. Gall, Switzerland. His parents were non-practising Jews and members of the Ethical Society. Rosenheim had one sister, Adele Van Noorden (née Rosenheim) and one brother, Major Charles Leslie Rosenheim 25 August 1912 – 12 February 1945.

Rosenheim was educated at Shrewsbury School, St John's College, Cambridge and University College Hospital (UCH) Medical School.

Career
In 1938, Rosenheim was awarded the Bilton Pollard Travelling Fellowship and worked as research assistant for Dr Fuller Albright at the Massachusetts General Hospital.

Rosenheim joined the Royal Army Medical Corps in 1941 and served in the Middle East and Italy, leaving the Army as a brigadier. From 1945 to 1946, Rosenheim was consultant physician to the Allied Land Forces in South East Asia.

From 1949 and for the next 21 years, Rosenheim was Professor of Medicine at UCH, resigning in 1960 but retaining his links with UCH, acting as a part-time physician. His own particular medical interests were renal disease and hypertension, and he was among the first in his profession to convince his fellows that hypertension could be treated.

Awards and honours
In the Royal College of Physicians, Rosenheim was elected a Member (MRCP) in 1934 and a Fellow (FRCP) in 1941; he delivered the Lumleian lecture at the College in 1963 entitled  Problems of Chronic Pyelonephritis. In 1966, he was elected President of the Royal College of Physicians (PRCP), a position he held until his death in 1972. In 1972, a few months before he died, he was elected under Statute 12 a Fellow of the Royal Society (FRS).

Rosenheim was appointed a Commander of the Order of the British Empire (CBE) in the 1955 Birthday Honours, he was promoted to Knight Commander (KBE) in the 1967 New Year Honours. Sir Max was created a life peer on 31 July 1970 taking the title Baron Rosenheim, of the London Borough of Camden.

Other titles and honours include:

 Mr Max Rosenheim (1908–1932)
 Dr Max Rosenheim (1932–1938)
 Dr Max Rosenheim MRCP (1938–1941)
 Dr Max Rosenheim FRCP (1941–1950)
 Professor Max Rosenheim FRCP (1950–1955)
 Professor Max Rosenheim CBE FRCP (1955–1967)
 Professor Sir Max Rosenheim KBE FRCP (1967–1970)
 The Rt Hon Professor The Lord Rosenheim KBE FRCP (1970–1972)
 The Rt Hon Professor The Lord Rosenheim KBE FRCP FRS (1972–1972)

Personal life
Rosenheim never married.

References

1908 births
1972 deaths
Medical doctors from London
Alumni of St John's College, Cambridge
Massachusetts General Hospital fellows
Knights Commander of the Order of the British Empire
Fellows of the Royal College of Physicians
Fellows of the Royal Society
Life peers
Presidents of the Royal College of Physicians
English people of German-Jewish descent
English people of Swiss descent
British people of Swiss-Jewish descent
20th-century British medical doctors
Life peers created by Elizabeth II